The Teatro Nacional de Cuba is a theatre building in Havana, Cuba, on Plaza de la Revolución.

History

Construction of the National Theater of Cuba was approved in 1951 under the administration of Carlos Prío Socarrás, work began the following year when President Fulgencio Batista laid the foundation stone.

The first stone for the construction of the National Theater was laid on July 29, 1952, two months later a contract was signed with the company Purdy & Henderson as civil contractor and with the firm Arroyo y Menéndez as technical and optional director of the work. The National Theater was inspired by Radio City Music Hall in New York and was conceived with three rooms: a large one for opera and ballet performances, a small one for dramatic theater, and an "experimental" room, as well as large rooms for dressing rooms, workshops, a library, and academies. It was projected as the largest theater in Cuba and was expected to be completed by July 1954, but the construction was so slow and discontinuous that in 1959, a large part of the work was yet to be done.

The National Theatre has two auditoriums, the Sala Covarrubias and the Sala Avellaneda. The two auditoriums have a combined capacity of 3,500 people, making it one of the largest theatres in the country. Events here include productions from the national ballet, theatre productions, musicals, and orchestra as well as a number of lectures and workshops.

In 1960, the Sala Covarrubias was inaugurated and a series of cultural activities were held during that year, but since March 1961 they stopped presenting shows due to their still precarious conditions, being destined to serve as a rehearsal room and, later, for storage of sets. and furniture. It is not until the second half of the 1970s that the completion of the building is assumed, being its complete and definitive inauguration on September 3, 1979.

Gallery

See also

 Radio City Music Hall
 Purdy and Henderson
 Havana Plan Piloto

References

1979 establishments in Cuba
Theatres in Havana
Theatres completed in 1979
Concert halls in Cuba
20th-century architecture in Cuba